EMU, as an initialism, may refer to:

Science and technology
 Enhanced mini-USB connector
 Electric multiple unit, a type of train design
 Electromagnetic unit in the centimetre–gram–second system
 English Metric Unit used in Office Open XML
 Evolutionary Map of the Universe, a radio-astronomical survey
 Extravehicular Mobility Unit, a NASA space suit
 EMU (speech database system), software to create, manipulate and analyze speech databases; see

Universities
 Eastern Mediterranean University, North Cyprus
 Eastern Mennonite University, United States
 Eastern Michigan University, United States
 Estonian University of Life Sciences (Eesti Maaülikool), Estonia

Other uses
 Economic and monetary union
 Economic and Monetary Union of the European Union
 Encyclopedia of Modern Ukraine
Erb Memorial Union at the University of Oregon, United States
 Evangelical Members within the Uniting Church in Australia
 Experimental Military Unit, a US Army - Royal Australian Navy helicopter force
 Early Middle Ukrainian, an aspect of the Ruthenian language from the 15th to the mid-16th century

See also
 Emu (disambiguation)
 EMU Australia, a brand of footwear